Today's FBI is an American crime drama television series, an updated and revamped version of the earlier series The F.B.I.

Like the original program, this series is based on actual cases from the files of the Federal Bureau of Investigation, and the F.B.I. was involved in the making of the show. Unlike the original series, which ran for nine seasons, this show ran for only 18 episodes (following a TV-movie pilot) on ABC, during the 1981–82 season.

Cast
 Mike Connors as Ben Slater, a veteran "G-Man" who is the chief and mentor of an elite unit of agents.
 Joseph Cali as Nick Frazier, the one "ethnic" member of the team, a young and determined agent.
 Carol Potter as Maggie Clinton, the one female member.
 Rick Hill as Al Gordean, a "country boy" and strongman of the group, is often partnered with Nick.
 Harold Sylvester as Dwayne Thompson, the one African American on the show; he often acts as the member who keeps the others focused.

Episode list

Reception
The series suffered from low ratings as a result of direct competition from CBS's Top 20 hits Archie Bunker's Place and One Day at a Time and was cancelled after only 18 episodes.

According to Michele Malach of Fort Lewis College, the series attempted a more positive portrayal of the FBI by using diverse characters and a "fallacious assumption that its audience still viewed special agents as 'us' rather than 'them'," in contrast to federal agents with "a rigid, dogmatic, inhumane bureaucracy" depicted in later media, like Point Break, Betrayed, and The X-Files. Viewers "did not buy either the image or [the series]," prompting a cancellation. Richard Gib Powers called it "pointless and a cover-up [of] the FBI villainy[.]"

References

External links

1981 American television series debuts
1982 American television series endings
Television series by Sony Pictures Television
1980s American crime drama television series
American Broadcasting Company original programming
English-language television shows
Television series about the Federal Bureau of Investigation
Television shows set in Los Angeles